Georgios Sakellarios (1765–1838) was a chief physician at the court of Ali Pasha.

He was born in Kozani and studied German and French and also Philosophy in Hungary. In addition to his post at the court, he was an associate of Rigas Ferraios and Perraivos.

See also
List of Macedonians (Greek)

External links 
List of Great Macedonians (15th-19th century)

1765 births
1838 deaths
People from Kozani
Greek Macedonians
Greek educational theorists
Macedonia under the Ottoman Empire
18th-century Greek physicians
19th-century Greek physicians